Op-Center or Tom Clancy's Op-Center (1995) is the first novel in Tom Clancy's Op-Center created by Tom Clancy and Steve Pieczenik. It was written by Jeff Rovin. It was adapted into the film of the same name.

Plot introduction
Renegade South Korean soldiers set off a bomb in Seoul during a festival and make it look like it was done by North Korea. Op-Center must prove that North Korea had nothing to do with it before the situation gets hostile. To make matters worse, a rogue general plans to launch some nuclear missiles at Tokyo, Japan intending to start a war against North Korea.

Characters 
Paul Hood - Director of Op-Center. 
 General Mike Rodgers - Deputy Director of Op-Center and commander of Op-Center's Military Branch, STRIKER. 2-Star General and who served in the Special Forces and Delta Force and a Vietnam War Veteran.
Gregory Donald - Former US Ambassador to South Korea. 
Kim Hwan - Deputy Director of Korean Intelligence Agency. 
Major Lee - The Evil MasterMind.
Av Lincoln - Secretary of State
Ernesto Colon - Defense Secretary
Melvin Parker - Chairman of the Joint Chiefs of Staff
Greg Kidd - CIA Director

1994 American novels
American thriller novels
Techno-thriller novels
Novels by Jeff Rovin
Tom Clancy's Op-Center
Novels set in Korea
Berkley Books books
American novels adapted into films